Ralph E. Burley House is a historic home located at Lebanon, Laclede County, Missouri.  It was designed by architect Henry H. Hohenschild and built in 1904.  It is a -story, Colonial Revival style frame dwelling. It has an irregular floorplan and features a wraparound front porch supported by round wooden columns.

It was listed on the National Register of Historic Places in 1994.

References

Houses on the National Register of Historic Places in Missouri
Colonial Revival architecture in Missouri
Houses completed in 1904
Buildings and structures in Laclede County, Missouri
National Register of Historic Places in Laclede County, Missouri
1904 establishments in Missouri